CITT can refer to:

Continental Institute of Technology and Transformation

Canadian International Trade Tribunal
Canadian Institute of Traffic and Transportation
Canadian Institute for Theatrical Technology
Center for Investment, Technology and Trade